Michèle Lorrain is a Canadian artist specializing in painting and installation art.

Life and work
Lorrain was born in 1960 in Montreal, Quebec. She lives and works in Sainte-Louise, Quebec. She earned her bachelor's degree from the Université Laval, followed by her Masters of Fine Arts from the Université du Québec à Montréal.

In September 2015, the Vimont Community Center in Laval, Quebec installed Lorrain's installation piece, in my yard on the north wall of the Vimont Community Center.

Collections
Black Mirrors 02.15.22.13, 2012, Musée national des beaux-arts du Québec

Exhibitions
the lost steps, 2016—2017, Biennale internationale du lin de Portneuf

References

External links

21st-century Canadian women artists
21st-century Canadian painters
1960 births
Artists from Montreal
People from Chaudière-Appalaches
Université Laval alumni
Université du Québec à Montréal alumni
Canadian women painters
Living people